The Kangaroo Island Football League (KIFL) is an Australian rules football competition based on Kangaroo Island in South Australia, Australia.  It is an affiliated member of the South Australian National Football League and is zoned to the South Adelaide Football Club.

Clubs

Current clubs

Former clubs

Venues
Dudley United Eagles play at Penneshaw town oval, Penneshaw. 
Kingscote Hounds play at Soldier's Memorial Park, Kingscote town oval, Kingscote. 
Parndana Roosters play at Parndana Sports Club, Parndana. 
Western Districts Saints play at Western Districts Sporting Complex, Gosse. 
Wisanger Panthers at 'Panther Park', Wisanger Sports Club, Bay of Shoals.

Grand Finals alternate between the island's five clubs.

History

Pre WWII (Late 1800s – 1945)
Australian Football began on Kangaroo Island in the late 1800s, with the first organised competition beginning in 1908 with the formation of Kingscote and Dudley United clubs. Wisanger joined in 1910, thereafter several clubs came and went such as Muston.

Post WWII (1946 –      )
The Kangaroo Island Football League (KIFL) was formed in 1946 with founding clubs of Kingscote and Wisanger. They were joined by Parndana, American River and Nepean Bay. With the demise of the latter two clubs Western Districts became the fifth club in 1970, with the league maintaining that structure to the present day. The reserve competition was formed in 1958 and the colts competition. Senior colts was formed in 1966 as an U15's competition, in 1976 saw it change to U16's and currently it is U15's. The junior colts was formed in 1970, formerly called the minis, and in 1976 it was changed to U13's and today it is the U12's.

Notable past players

Grade Structure
As of 2018 the KIFL hosts 5 grades of competition, which include two senior grades, A-Grade & Reserves, and 3 colts grades, U15's, U12's & AusKick (U12's and AusKick do not play for premiership points). Currently all clubs have one team in all levels of competition.

Premierships

Individual awards

KIFL Mail Medalists
The Mail Medal is awarded to the best and fairest footballer in the highest grade of competition in Kangaroo Island Football League. Sunday Mail newspaper presents the best and fairest footballer in each country league in South Australia with a medal.

Johnston Medal
The Johnston Medal is awarded to the best and fairest footballer in the reserve grade of competition in Kangaroo Island Football League.

Pharmacy Medal
The Pharmacy Medal is awarded to the best and fairest footballer in the colts grade of competition in Kangaroo Island Football League.

Season Leading goal kickers
Leading goal kickers in each grade at the end of the regular season.

League records

Most Premierships & Grand Final appearances 

United merged with Dudley in 1965 to become Dudley United.

Individual records
Most Mail medal wins: Roger Williams (Kingscote / Dudley United)- 7  David Florance (Dudley United)- 5 – Clayton Willson (Dudley United)-5
Most Mail medal runner-up's: David Florance (Dudley United)- 4
Most Johnston medal wins:   Michael Mills (Parndana), 3
Most Pharmacy medal wins: Brett Padroth (Kingscote), 2- Paul Jefferson (Wisanger), 2- Callum Willson (Dudley United), 2
Most Ozone medal wins: David Florance (Dudley United), 7- Clayton Willson (Dudley United), 7
Most goals in a season (A-Grade): Bradley Barns (Western Districts)- 96 in 1999
Most goals in a season (Reserves): Sam Short (Western Districts)- 68 in 2018
Most goals in a season (Colts): Koby Cockshell (Kingscote)- 104 in 2019
Most games (club): Kingscote: David Geci (313), Brian Murray, Peter Lovering(300+),  Wisanger: David Neave (543), Dudley United: David Florance (448), Parndana: Steven May (498), Western Districts: Darryl Weatherspoon (387)

Club individual records 
Club with most Mail medal wins: Dudley United-16, Wisanger-14, Kingscote14, Parndana-13, Western Districts-6, Nepean Bay 5,  Dudley-2, United-1
Club with most Mail medal runner-up's:
Club with most Johnston medal wins: Dudley United-15, Parndana-13, Wisanger-11, Kingscote-10, Western Districts-5
Club with most Pharmacy medal wins: Wisanger-15, Dudley United-13, Kingscote-13, Dudley United-12, Western Districts-6
Club with most Ozone medal wins: Dudley United, 16- Wisanger, 15- Kingscote, 11- Parndana, 9- Western Districts, 5
Dudley United most Mail medal wins: Clayton Willson, 6
Kingscote most Mail medal wins: Roger Williams, 6
Parndana most Mail medal wins: John Obst, Allan Howard, Damien Trethewey, Nathan Trethewey, 2
Western Districts most Mail medal wins: Josh Graham, 2
Wisanger most Mail medal wins: Trevor Bland, 2
Nepean Bay most Mail medal wins: John Lovering, 3

Representative Football
Kangaroo Island qualified in the B division for the 1970 Caltex Country Championship and were successful, defeating the Woomera, Southern and Murraylands Leagues.  In 1988 Kangaroo Island combined with Great Southern to play a match against Tatiara in the opening round of the Escort Cup, losing by three points.  Association matches were played spasmodically against Southern Yorke Peninsula and Yorke Valley.
The KIFL was involved with the Mortlock Shield which takes place amongst several amateur country teams in Port Lincoln annually competing from 1990–1996 and from 2010–2016, the highest placing being fourth out of six teams.
From 1992–1998 KIFL played an annual match against the Great Southern under 23 team, the Great Southern side leading the head-to-head 5–2.  In 1999, KIFL took on a full strength Great Southern side, losing by 99 points.  From 2000–2009 association matches were played spasmodically against Hills Country, Riverland and Southern leagues.  Since 2017 matches have been played against Southern under 23's, KIFL losing the first match, winning the second and in 2019 a draw.  Since 2015, the best of the KIFL Under 17's have played against the Southern Under 15's, Southern leading the head to head 6-1.

-||Under 15's results (since 2015)             || A Grade results (since 2017)|
-|| 2015- Southern 11.18 (84) def. K.I 1.2 (8) | K.I 7.18 (60) def by Southern 10.7 (67)|
-|| 2016- K.I 4.4 (28) def by Southern 4.9 (33) |

References

External links
 KIFL Fixture & Results- Sporting Pulse
 Country Footy

Books
 Encyclopedia of South Australian country football clubs / compiled by Peter Lines. 
 South Australian country football digest volumes 1 and 2/ by Peter Lines 

Australian rules football competitions in South Australia
Kangaroo Island